The Virginia Beach City Council is the legislative branch that governs the City of Virginia Beach and its more than 450,000 citizens. It has 11 members that serve four-year terms and are elected on a staggered basis. General elections are held the Tuesday following the first Monday in November in even-numbered years. All registered voters are eligible to vote for all members of City Council. Three Council Members and the Mayor serve "At Large" with no district residency requirement. All other Council Members are required to live in the districts they represent: Bayside, Beach, Centerville, Kempsville, Lynnhaven, Princess Anne, and Rose Hall. The Council holds regular meetings on alternate Tuesday evenings on the second floor of the Virginia Beach City Hall.

History

Direct election of Mayor, 1988
Starting with the fall 1988 election, the city's mayor was chosen directly by voters. Previously, the mayor was appointed from among city council members elected to represent the city's various boroughs. In that election, Meyera Oberndorf became the city's first female mayor and first to be directly elected.

Election at large from districts, 1998
In 1998, Virginia Beach abolished its system of boroughs from which seven council members were elected and formed in their place seven new districts including Centerville, Kempsville, Rose Hall, Bayside, Lynnhaven, Beach, and Princess Anne. Candidates were required to be residents of the districts for which they ran, but all voting was at-large.

Elimination of at-large elections for districts: Holloway vs. City of Virginia Beach, 2020-22 
On October 6, 2020, a trial began in federal court in Virginia Beach between residents Latasha Holloway and Georgia Allen and the City of Virginia Beach. Filing their lawsuit in 2017, the residents alleged that the city's process for electing members to the city council violated the 1965 Voting Rights Act. The lawsuit claimed that the system unlawfully diluted minority voting strength and denied minorities an equal opportunity to elect candidates of their choice. That same day, the city council cancelled their regular meeting after council member John Moss tested positive for COVID-19. Two days later, it was announced that, due to the ongoing pandemic, council meetings would now be held at the Virginia Beach Convention Center.

In 2021, Virginia passed HB 2198, which prohibits local governments from using at-large voting for district elections.

Later in 2021, the trial court found that the City's at-large voting system violates Section 2 of the Voting Rights Act by diluting the voting strength of the Black, Asian and Hispanic minority groups, and ordered that the city adopt a different voting system.

The city worked with a special master, who developed a 10 district ward system, plus one at-large contest for Mayor, late in 2021. Ward candidates would be elected only by voters in the ward. The court ordered the adoption of that system.

In 2022, the United States Court of Appeals for the Fourth Circuit held in a 2-1 opinion that because HB 2198 had already prevented the City from conducting any future City Council elections under the electoral system that Plaintiffs challenged, that the case was moot, and overturned the district court's ruling. The timing was such that the 10-ward system would still be used in 2022. In the future, it could be modified, but would have to meet both the requirements of both HB 2198, and the Voting Rights Act of Virginia, which prohibits at large election systems if those systems impair the ability of minority groups to either elect candidates of their choice or to influence the outcome of an election.

Current council

Past councils

1963-1998

1998-2022

2023-Present

Election results

2020 general election

References

Notes

Virginia Beach